"Long Walk Home" is a Bruce Springsteen song.

Long Walk Home may also refer to:

 "Long Walk Home", a song by The City Harmonic from their 2013 album Heart
 Long Walk Home: Music from the Rabbit-Proof Fence, the third soundtrack and twelfth album overall released by Peter Gabriel
 The Long Walk Home, a 1990 American historical drama film
 Long Walk Home (Blind album), 2001

See also
 Long Ride Home, a 1988 novel by W. Michael Gear
 Long Walk Hurdle, a Grade 1 National Hunt hurdle race in Great Britain
 Long Way Home (disambiguation)
 The Long Road Home, a 2005 John Fogerty compilation album
 The Long Voyage Home, a 1940 American drama film